Hammeville is a commune in the Meurthe-et-Moselle department in north-eastern France. The "T"-shaped village of Hammeville, which has a population of 174 (2015), sits atop a rise surrounded by agricultural fields.  The mainstay of the economy is farming, although there are an increasing number of people building homes in the village and commuting to work in Nancy and other places. In August 1976, in order to deal with a drought that had stunted a number of crops, men from the village were forced to travel to south-central France in order to load transport trucks with hay for the village's farms.

See also
Communes of the Meurthe-et-Moselle department

References

Communes of Meurthe-et-Moselle